Marie Antoinette Wright (born February 7, 1968), better known by her stage name, Free, is an American media personality, television producer, choreographer and philanthropist. She became known as the first host (alongside A.J. Calloway) of BET's 106 & Park until 2005. She was later as a disc jockey at KKBT 100.3 The Beat in L.A., serving as a morning drive co-host at WPGC-FM in Washington, D.C., and is the former co-host of The Ed Lover Morning Show on Power 105.1 in New York.

Career
Free Marie was born as Marie Antoinette Wright to African-American parents. She became involved in the arts as a child in Boston, Massachusetts. She attended the Roxbury Center for Performing Arts for 11 years, but traveled and toured as part of a young dance troupe. Inspired by her hometown group New Edition, she was part of a few groups in Boston performing and winning talent shows, while improving her singing and rap skills. One of her biggest breaks in her dancing career was performing in the 1991 hip-hop music video of Good Vibrations by Marky Mark and the Funky Bunch.

Free left Boston to immerse herself in her true passion: music. One of Free's "stepping stones" was an internship at a radio station in Massachusetts, where she began to make a name for herself. She then made career moves between Los Angeles and New York City in an effort to build the structure of her calling. She appeared on Patriots, the second track on Can-I-Bus, the debut album from critically acclaimed hip-hop artist Canibus. This appearance was her first major appearance and the album eventually went gold. Her appearance on the album was a direct result of her professional connection with Wyclef and his Refugee Camp crew.

Free stated: “What influenced me to chase after my dreams was music itself; its power and creative medium." Fate led her to a casting held by BET, where executives chose her to co-host (with AJ Calloway) their signature show based in New York: 106 & Park: Top 10 Live. During her 5 years at 106 & Park, Free interviewed notable people such as Michael Jackson, Denzel Washington, Aaliyah, Halle Berry, Maxwell, and Alicia Keys.

In 2003, Free began to record a full-length debut studio album titled, Pressure Free, which was expected to be released in Spring 2008. Free went on to promote the album and release rumored singles via underground mixtapes from early 2003 throughout 2007. A rumored single, Uh Huh, featuring Busta Rhymes, leaked via Internet in the aspiration of she, again generating rumors for the album. Contributors for the debut included Faith Evans, Bink, Scott Storch, Rockwilder, Kanye West, Just Blaze, Rah Digga, Timbaland, and Missy Elliott. As of 2012, there is no confirmation if the album will be released.

On December 1, 2009, Clear Channel Radio's Power 105.1 (WWPR-FM) (New York) had added with R&B, hip hop, and old-school songs, announced that Malikha Mallette will move to co-host on The Ed Lover Show, at 5:30 am until 9:30 am while DJ Envy is Power 105.1's new afternoon personality, working at 2:00 pm until 6:00 pm on weekdays. The announcement was made by Cadillac Jack, Power 105.1's program director. Free stated on her Twitter page, "Ok that's a Tuesday morning for ya: As of now I will no longer be heard on Power 105 in the A.M.: NY thanks for the laughs..rock on."

In October 2010, Free returned to BET to produce and star in 106 & Park’s two-episode anniversary show : 106 & Park: 10 Years & Counting and 106 & Park: The Celebration, 10 Years Live! Both shows earned the highest 106 & Park ratings in BET history.

She can also be seen on BET again as a presenter at the inaugural Black Girls Rock! on November 7, 2010.

On May 9, 2011, Free began co-hosting The Big Tigger Morning Show on Washington, D.C. area radio station WPGC-FM (95.5), alongside Darian "Big Tigger" Morgan at 6:00 am until 10:00 am on weekdays. In later months, when Big Tigger was fired, Free continued the radio show without him.

On December 19, 2014, Free also returned to BET, hosting the final episode of 106 & Park, titled "The Final Act" (with Bow Wow, Terrence J and Rocsi).

Philanthropy
In 2002, Free founded the Free4Life Foundation, a non-profit dedicated to empowering young people in disadvantaged neighborhoods through programs that encourage literacy, financial education and creative arts. The Free4Life Foundation has created opportunities that inspire, support, encourage and strengthen the healthy development of young people in Boston's underserved communities. Initially focused on eradicating domestic violence and improving financial literacy, Free is currently in the process of expanding the depth and breadth of the foundation's scope. Through the foundation, Free also launched the successful fundraising event, Break! Break!.

Free is also an advocate for breast cancer awareness. In October 2010, she participated in the American Cancer Society's "Making Strides Against Breast Cancer" charity walk in honor of her late mother Selina "Tina" Wright. She later formed team "Walk 4 Tina," as she and her family walked 5.7 miles to help raise donations and awareness.

Personal life
As of 2023, Free now lives in a private life.

Discography
 2004: Free's World (mixtape)
 2007: Pressure Free (shelved)

Album appearances
 1998: Canibus – "Can-I-Bus" (On "Patriots")
 2000: Wyclef Jean – The Ecleftic: 2 Sides II a Book (on "Da Cypha")
 2001: Erick Sermon – React (on "We Don't Care")
 2001: Ed O.G. – The Truth Hurts (on "Just Because")
 2009: Lisa "Left-Eye" Lopes — Eye Legacy (on "Spread Your Wings")

Remixes
 1999: "Bring It All to Me (Triple Threat Mix)" — Blaque (feat. NY Glaze, Jazz-Ming Mackey, and Free)
 2003: "21 Answers" — Lil' Mo

Soundtracks
 1996: The Associate (on "Mr. Big Stuff" with Queen Latifah and Shades)
 1999: Music Inspired by the Motion Picture Life – (on "What Goes Around" with Khadejia)
 2000: The PJs: Music from & Inspired by the Hit Television Series – "Holiday" (with Earth, Wind & Fire)
 2003: The Fighting Temptations: Music from the Motion Picture (on "Fighting Temptation" — Beyoncé (feat. Missy Elliott, MC Lyte, and Free)

References

External links

 Official website
 

American women rappers
African-American women rappers
American television personalities
Living people
Musicians from Boston
1968 births
People from Dorchester, Massachusetts
21st-century American rappers
21st-century American women musicians
21st-century African-American women
21st-century African-American musicians
20th-century African-American people
20th-century African-American women
21st-century women rappers